Jamie Amanda Lee (born March 15, 1983) is an American comedian, actress, and writer best known for Girl Code, Crashing, I Love..., Ridiculousness, and The Wedding Coach. She is the author of the 2016 book Weddiculous: An Unfiltered Guide to Being a Bride.

Early life 
Lee was born and raised in Dallas, Texas. Her mother's family is Jewish and from New Jersey, whereas her father's Texan family is not Jewish. She attended the University of Texas in Austin, Texas, where she studied film, theatre, and screenwriting. After graduating, she relocated to New York City, where she began her career in stand up comedy, writing, and acting.

She cites her comedic influences as David Cross, Todd Barry, Margaret Cho, Nick Swardson, Joan Rivers, Ellen DeGeneres, and Miss Piggy.

Career 
While in New York City, Lee worked in the publicity department at Comedy Central before leaving to focus on stand-up comedy. She then served as a writer's assistant for Jerry Seinfeld, Tom Papa, Jeff Cesario, and Chuck Martin on The Marriage Ref. In 2010, Lee got her career break when she made it to the semi-finals on season 7 of NBC's Last Comic Standing. She then booked college tours, a slot on Conan, a recurring guest place at Chelsea Handler's roundtable on Chelsea Lately, and in 2011, a position as a writer on MTV's Ridiculousness. In 2012, Lee was selected as a New Face in Just For Laughs at the Montreal comedy festival.

Lee is best known for her role as a core cast member on the popular MTV show Girl Code. She stated in an interview: "I love, hopefully, being a voice for girls and also connecting and making them feel heard and saying things that resonate with them. That's very important to me and there's no part of me that feels shame or like I'm somehow denying the other sex by speaking as a woman, to women. Because I think the more specific you can be about your experience, just as a human being, the more it appeals to everybody of both genders."

She has appeared as a stand-up comedian on Late Night with Conan O'Brien, The Late Late Show with James Corden, Last Call with Carson Daly, Chelsea Lately, and @midnight. She is the host of the TruTV series 10 Things and the Entertainment Weekly online series Polished.

In December 2016, Lee released her debut book Weddiculous: The Unfiltered Guide to Being a Bride  after marrying her husband, comedian Dan Black, in April of that year. She co-authored the book with comedian Jaqueline Novak. It was named #1 on Bustle Magazine's list of best wedding books in April 2017. The book also garnered praise from James Corden, Nikki Glaser, Pete Holmes, Conan O'Brien, and Phoebe Robinson. The Laugh Button stated: "What Amy Sedaris has done for hospitality and crafting, Jamie Lee now does for weddings."

In 2017, Elle Magazine named her as one of the top 11 comedians to watch that year. She has also been named as one of the "Top Five Comedians Who Should Be Movie Stars" by Nerve, the "Top 18 Women You Should Be Following on Twitter" by The Huffington Post, and the "52 Female Stand-Up Comedians You Need to Know" by Refinery29.

In 2018, she was the female lead on the second season of the HBO series Crashing, for which she was a writer on the first season.

In 2021, Netflix released The Wedding Coach, a reality TV series about wedding planning hosted by Lee.

Filmography

Film

Television

References

External links 
 Jamie Lee official site
 
 Weddiculous book official site

1983 births
Living people
American stand-up comedians
Screenwriters from Texas
American television writers
American women comedians
American women screenwriters
Moody College of Communication alumni
Actresses from Texas
21st-century American comedians
American women television writers
21st-century American screenwriters
21st-century American women writers
Primetime Emmy Award winners